Casey McGuire (born 24 January 1980) is an Australian former professional rugby league footballer. A Queensland State of Origin representative half back, he played his club football in the National Rugby League (NRL) for the Brisbane Broncos (with whom he won the 2006 NRL Premiership) and Parramatta Eels, as well as in the Super League for the Catalans Dragons.

Early life
Born 24 January 1980 in Nambour, Queensland, McGuire was playing junior league for Caloundra Sharks & Kawana Dolphins. He then attended Caloundra State High QSSRL in 1997 when he was selected for the Australian Schoolboys rugby league team.

Professional career

Parramatta Eels
McGuire made his NRL debut in round 22 of the 1998 season for the Parramatta Eels against Penrith at Penrith Park.  The following week, he played in the club's 50–4 victory over Western Suburbs at Parramatta Stadium.

Brisbane Broncos
The next season, he returned to Queensland to play for the Brisbane Broncos. At Brisbane, he was a utility player, normally used in games from the bench.  In the 2002 NRL season, he played in Brisbane's preliminary final defeat against eventual premiers the Sydney Roosters.  McGuire subsequently played in the club's 2004 and 2005 finals campaigns.

McGuire played from the interchange bench in the 2006 NRL Grand Final victory over Melbourne at Telstra Stadium.

Queensland
He was selected for the Queensland Maroons in the 2005 State of Origin series playing off the bench for games 1 and 2.

Super League
McGuire missed the Broncos' 2007 World Club Challenge appearance due to his move to France to play in the Super League for Catalans Dragons.

Return to Australia
McGuire played 21 games in 2011 for Parramatta as the club narrowly avoided the wooden spoon.

A pectoral muscle injury during the 2012 NRL season put the remainder of McGuire's playing career in doubt. McGuire returned for Parramatta in their final game of the season which came against St. George Illawarra in round 26 at ANZ Stadium. It was also the final game for retiring Parramatta players Nathan Hindmarsh and Luke Burt.  Parramatta would go on to lose the match 29-8 and the club finished last for the first time since 1972.  The game was subsequently McGuire's last in the top grade.

References

External links
Official Casey McGuire profile
Official Casey McGuire NRL profile
Article at nrl.com

1980 births
Living people
Australian rugby league players
Brisbane Broncos players
Catalans Dragons players
Parramatta Eels players
Queensland Rugby League State of Origin players
Rugby league centres
Rugby league five-eighths
Rugby league halfbacks
Rugby league hookers
Rugby league locks
Rugby league players from Nambour, Queensland
Toowoomba Clydesdales players